The military equipment of Israel includes a wide array of arms, armored vehicles, artillery, missiles, planes, helicopters, and warships. Many of these are purchased overseas and many are indigenous designs. Until the Six-Day War of 1967, the Israel Defense Forces' principal supplier was France; since then, it has been the United States government and defense companies in the United States. In the early 21st century, Israeli companies (such as Soltam Systems) began selling arms to the United States. Much military equipment undergoes improvements in Israeli workshops. 

In addition to weapons purchased overseas and indigenous products, Israel also operates and maintains large stockpiles of Soviet-made equipment, captured from Arab armies over the course of the Arab–Israeli conflict.

History
During the 1948 Arab–Israeli War, the military equipment in the IDF was very diverse and inconsistent. This was due to the severe limitation in obtaining war materiel (the British Mandate and the Arab embargo). During the 1950s, the IDF began the process of standardization, relying primarily on French military equipment.

During the Six-Day War, the military cooperation with France ceased (the French Weapons Embargo of 1967) and Israel began to rely on American weaponry and on local research and development. During the 1980s and 1990s, the IDF increased its supplies of American arms, armor and aircraft, aiming for technological superiority over Arab countries, toward "a smaller, smarter army".

The reliance on locally manufactured military equipment has also greatly increased. Today, the overwhelming majority of Israel's military equipment is either manufactured in the United States (and often modified in Israeli workshops), or is developed and manufactured locally, with an increasing emphasis on advanced technology, including aerospace and electronics.

Local military development
Some of the military equipment developed locally have been:

 Small arms
 Dror light machine gun
 IWI Negev light machine gun
 Uzi submachine gun
 Uzi pistol
 Desert Eagle pistol
 Jericho 941 pistol
 BUL M-5 pistol
 BUL Storm pistol
 SP-21 Barak pistol
 IMI Galil assault rifle
 IWI ACE assault rifle
 IMI Tavor assault rifle
 M89SR sniper rifle
 Hezi SM-1 semi-automatic PDW
 Anti-tank rockets and missiles
 MATADOR Shoulder-launched missile weapon
 B-300 Shoulder-launched missile weapon
 Shoulder-Launched Multipurpose Assault Weapon
 Shipon Shoulder-launched missile weapon
 FGM-172 SRAW
 MAPATS ATGM
 Spike ATGM
 LAHAT ATGM
 Nimrod ATGM
 Other missiles
 Guided Advanced Tactical Rocket - Laser
 Shafrir air-to-air missile
 Derby air-to-air missile
 Python air-to-air missile
 Gabriel naval anti-ship missile
 ADM-141 TALD
 Popeye AGM-142 air-to-surface missile
 Delilah cruise missile / anti-radiation missile
 LORA theater ballistic missile
 Jericho medium-range ballistic missile
 Aircraft
 IAI Arava cargo aircraft
 IAI Sea Scan surveillance aircraft
 IAI Nesher fighter aircraft
 IAI Kfir fighter aircraft
 IAI Namer fighter aircraft
 IAI Lavi fighter aircraft
 ATG Javelin jet trainer aircraft
 Watercraft
 Shaldag class fast patrol boat
 Dabur class patrol boat
 Dvora class fast patrol boat
 Super Dvora Mk II class fast patrol boat
 Super Dvora Mk III class fast patrol boat
 Sa'ar 3-class missile boat
 Sa'ar 4-class missile boat
 Sa'ar 4.5-class missile boat
 Sa'ar 5-class corvette
 Gal-class submarine
 Dolphin-class submarine
 Spaceflight
 Shavit spaceflight launch vehicle
 EROS earth observation satellite
 Ofeq reconnaissance satellite
 TecSAR reconnaissance satellite
 Weapon stations
 CornerShot SWAT weapon
 Rafael Overhead Weapon Station
 Samson Remote Controlled Weapon Station
 Typhoon Weapon System
 Active protection systems
 Trophy active protection system
 Iron Fist active protection system
 Flight Guard airborne IR countermeasures system
 Radars
 EL/M-2032 fire-control radar
 EL/M-2052 AESA radar
 EL/M-2075 Phalcon AEW&C radar
 EL/M-2080 Green Pine target tracking radar
 EL/M-2083 AEW&C radar
 Optronics
 ITL MARS reflex sight
 LITENING targeting pod
 Spice EO-GPS PGM guidance kit
 Skystar 300 ISR system

 Tanks
 Sherman tank
 Sho't tank
 Magach tank
 Sabra tank
 Merkava tank
 Fighting vehicles
 M113 variants
 Nimda Shoet APC
 Trail Blazer ARV
 IDF Nagmachon APC
 IDF Nakpadon CEV
 IDF Puma CEV
 IDF Achzarit APC
 IDF Namer IFV
 Nemmera ARV
 AIL Abir
 AIL Storm
 Plasan Sand Cat
 Wolf Armoured Vehicle
 Golan Armored Vehicle
 AIL M325 Command Car
 Artillery
 Davidka mortar
 Soltam M-66 mortar
 Soltam M-68 howitzer
 Soltam M-71 howitzer
 Soltam M-120 mortar
 L-33/39 Ro'em self-propelled howitzer
 Makmat self-propelled mortar
 MAR-240/290 rocket artillery launcher
 LAR-160 rocket artillery launcher
 LAROM rocket artillery launcher
 Cardom mortar
 Rascal self-propelled howitzer
 ATMOS 2000 self-propelled howitzer
 Sholef self-propelled howitzer
 Pereh missile carrier
 Unmanned aerial vehicles
 Tadiran Mastiff UAV
 Casper 250 UAV
 Silver Arrow Micro-V UAV
 Silver Arrow Sniper UAV
 IAI Scout UAV
 IAI Searcher UAV
 IAI Harpy UAV
 IAI Harop UAV
 IAI Bird-Eye UAV
 IAI I-View UAV
 IAI Ranger UAV
 IAI Heron UAV
 IAI Eitan UAV
 IAI Panther UAV
 IAI Ghost UAV
 IAI RQ-2 Pioneer UAV
 IAI RQ-5 Hunter UAV
 Elbit Skylark UAV
 Elbit Hermes 90 UAV
 Elbit Hermes 450 UAV
 Elbit Hermes 900 UAV
 Aeronautics Dominator UAV
 Aeronautics Orbiter UAV
 Urban Aeronautics X-Hawk UAV
 MicroFalcon UAV
 Unmanned surface vehicles
 VIPeR UGCV
 Protector USV
 Guardium UGV
 Raam HaShachar unmanned Caterpillar D9 armored bulldozer
 Silver Marlin USV
 Air-defense systems
 Machbet self-propelled anti-aircraft weapon
 Barak 1 naval surface-to-air missile
 Barak 8 naval surface-to-air missile
 SPYDER air-defense system
 Arrow anti-ballistic missile
 Tactical High Energy Laser
 Iron Dome short-range rocket defense system
 David's Sling medium-range rocket defense system
 Miscellaneous
 Mitznefet helmet camouflage
 Tomcar all-terrain vehicle
 MG251/253 smoothbore tank gun
 Kilshon anti-radiation missile launcher
 IDF Caterpillar D9 armored bulldozer
 Skunk riot control agent
 Scream riot control agent
 SIMON breach grenade
 Enhanced Tactical Computer
 OR-201 Combat Helmet

Ground forces equipment

Small arms

Rocket and grenade launchers

Missiles

Vehicles

Artillery

Air defense

Air forces equipment

Note there are multiple sources and these provide different figures:

Unmanned aerial vehicles
  IAI Heron
  IAI Eitan
  IAI Harpy
  IAI Harop
  Elbit Hermes 450
  Elbit Skylark

Weaponry
  MIM-104 Patriot surface-to-air missile
 / Arrow anti-ballistic missile
  PB500A1 laser-guided hard-target penetration bomb
  M-85 cluster bomb
  CBU-58 cluster bomb
  Mark 84 bomb
  MPR500 penetration bomb
  Spice glide bomb
  GBU-39 Small Diameter Bomb
  Python air-to-air missile
  Popeye air-to-surface missile AKA AGM-142 Have Nap in US use
  Popeye Turbo SLCM suspected long range submarine-launched cruise missile, suspected nuclear weapon carrier
  Joint Direct Attack Munition guided bomb
  AGM-65 Maverick air-to-surface missile
  AGM-88 HARM air-to-surface anti-radiation missile
  AGM-114 Hellfire air-to-surface anti-tank missile
  AIM-120 AMRAAM air-to-air missile
  AIM-9 Sidewinder heat seeking air-to-air missile
  MIM-72 Chaparral surface-to-air missile
  Delilah cruise missile
  Iron Dome anti-rocket and mortar defense missile
  David's Sling surface-to-air missile
  Jericho II intermediate range ballistic missile, suspected nuclear
  Jericho III intercontinental ballistic missile, suspected nuclear

Naval forces equipment
Below are the IDF's active service watercraft. The year of service, speed, full load displacement, and crew members, are in parentheses.

Missile boats
  Sa'ar 4 class missile boat (1970s; ; 450 tons; 45 crew members)
  Sa'ar 4.5 class missile boat (1980s; ; 488 tons; 53 crew members)

Corvettes
 / Sa'ar 5-class corvette (1990s; ; 1,227 tons; 64 crew members)
 / Sa'ar 6-class corvette (2020s; ; 1,900 tons; 70 crew members)

Patrol boats
  Dabur (1970s; ; 39 tons; 9 crew members)
  Shaldag (1989; ?; ; 15 crew members)
  Super Dvora Mk II (1996; ; 54 tons; 10 crew members)
  Nachshol (1997; ; 12 tons; 5 crew members)
  Super Dvora Mk III (2004; ; 54 tons; 10 crew members)

Support ships

 INS Bat Yam
 INS Bat Galim

Unmanned naval vehicles

  Protector USV

Submarines

Commando boats
  Dolphin type underwater craft
  Maiale type underwater craft
  Snunit boat
  Zaharon boat
  Moulit boat
  Morena rigid-hull inflatable boat

Remote weapon systems
  Typhoon Weapon System
  Rafael Overhead Weapon Station
  Samson Remote Controlled Weapon Station

Space systems
  AMOS communications satellite
  EROS earth observation satellite
  Ofeq reconnaissance satellite
  TecSAR reconnaissance satellite
  Shavit space launch vehicle

See also
 Defense industry of Israel
 Nuclear weapons and Israel

References

Sources
 

 
Israel Defense Forces
Israel Defense Forces